The Galilee Panhandle (Etzba HaGalil (lit. "Finger of the Galilee"), is an elongated geopolitical area or "panhandle" in northern Israel comprising the northernmost section of the Upper Galilee held by Israel, and the northern Jordan Rift Valley. The Galilee Panhandle incorporates five municipal authorities.  Towns in the Galilee Panhandle include Metula and Kiryat Shmona.

The ancient site of Tel Dan is located in the Galilean Panhandle.

Geography

The Galilee Panhandle is a narrow strip of land running from the Israel-Lebanon border in the far north to an imaginary line below the Hula Valley, approximately between the kibbutzim Malkia and Gonen,  in the south.

History
In 1920, the Sykes-Picot Treaty was amended to transfer areas of Jewish settlement from the territory of the French Mandate for Syria and the Lebanon to that of the British Mandate for Palestine. From April 1924, the area came under British control. An agreement was reached which enabled cultivation on both sides of the border with taxes being distributed between the British and French mandate authorities. The boundary was problematic, strategically and politically, but harnessing water sources in this region was vital for the  development of the country.

During Operation Yiftah in April and May 1948, the Arabs living in the Galilee Panhandle and the other Shia villages in Palestine were expelled by Palmach forces.

Cross-border raiding and rocket attacks from Lebanon have been an ongoing problem for communities in the Galilee Panhandle In November 2011, rockets were fired into Israel, landing near the border. The incident was called "a dangerous reminder" of the 34-day war in 2006 against Iranian and Syrian-backed Hezbollah forces in Lebanon.

See also
Geography of Israel
Good Fence, an epithet for  Israel's mountainous 80-mile northern border with Lebanon after the 1978 South Lebanon conflict
Upper Galilee Regional Council

References

Regions of Israel
Geography of Northern District (Israel)
Upper Galilee